Soudou  is a canton and village in the Assoli prefecture in the Kara Region  of north-eastern Togo.

References

External links
Satellite map at Maplandia.com

Populated places in Kara Region
Assoli Prefecture
Cantons of Togo